Friedrich Resch (born 7 February 1944) is an Austrian equestrian. He competed in two events at the 1972 Summer Olympics.

References

1944 births
Living people
Austrian male equestrians
Olympic equestrians of Austria
Equestrians at the 1972 Summer Olympics
Place of birth missing (living people)